ULAS J1342+0928 is the second-most distant known quasar detected and contains the second-most distant and oldest known supermassive black hole, at a reported redshift of z = 7.54. The ULAS J1342+0928 quasar is located in the Boötes constellation. The related supermassive black hole is reported to be "800 million times the mass of the Sun".

Discovery
On 6 December 2017, astronomers published that they had found the quasar using data from the Wide-field Infrared Survey Explorer (WISE) combined with ground-based surveys from one of the Magellan Telescopes at Las Campanas Observatory in Chile, as well as the Large Binocular Telescope in Arizona and the Gemini North telescope in Hawaii. The related black hole of the quasar existed when the universe was about 690 million years old (about 5 percent of its currently known age of 13.80 billion years).

The quasar comes from a time known as "the epoch of reionization", when the universe emerged from its Dark Ages. Extensive amounts of dust and gas have been detected to be released from the quasar into the interstellar medium of its host galaxy.

Description
ULAS J1342+0928 has a measured redshift of 7.54, which corresponds to a comoving distance of 29.36 billion light-years from Earth. When it was reported in 2017, it was the most distant quasar yet observed. The quasar emitted the light observed on Earth today less than 690 million years after the Big Bang, about 13.1 billion years ago.

The quasar's luminosity is estimated at  solar luminosities. This energy output is generated by a supermassive black hole estimated at  solar masses. According to lead astronomer Bañados, "This particular quasar is so bright that it will become a gold mine for follow-up studies and will be a crucial laboratory to study the early universe."

Significance
The light from ULAS J1342+0928 was emitted before the end of the theoretically-predicted transition of the intergalactic medium from an electrically neutral to an ionized state (the epoch of reionization). Quasars may have been an important energy source in this process, which marked the end of the cosmic Dark Ages, so observing a quasar from before the transition is of major interest to theoreticians. Because of their high ultraviolet luminosity, quasars also are some of the best sources for studying the reionization process. The discovery is also described as challenging theories of black hole formation, by having a supermassive black hole much larger than expected at such an early stage in the Universe's history, though this is not the first distant quasar to offer such a challenge.

See also
 List of the most distant astronomical objects
 List of quasars
 J0313–1806

References

External links
 Carnegie Institution for Science
 NASA APOD − Quasar Pictures
 Quasar Image Gallery/perseus

Astronomical objects discovered in 2017
Supermassive black holes
Boötes
Quasars